The 2015–16 Women's EHF Challenge Cup was the 19th edition of the European Handball Federation's fourth-tier competition for women's handball clubs, running from 14 November 2015.

Round and draw dates

All draws held at the European Handball Federation headquarters in Vienna, Austria.

Qualification stage

Round 3
Teams listed first played the first leg at home. Some teams agreed to play both matches in the same venue. Bolded teams qualified into last 16.

|}
Notes

a Both legs were hosted by ŽRK Aranđelovac.
b Both legs were hosted by HIFK.
c Both legs were hosted by Metraco Zaglebie Lubin.
d Both legs were hosted by Schuler Afbouwgroep/DOS.
e Both legs were hosted by HC Vardar junior.

Last 16
Teams listed first played the first leg at home. Some teams agreed to play both matches in the same venue. Bolded teams qualified into quarterfinals.

|}
Notes
a Both legs were hosted by Kastamonu Bld. GSK.
b Both legs were hosted by Schuler Afbouwgroep.
c Both legs were hosted by Colegio de Gaia.

Quarterfinals
Teams listed first played the first leg at home. Some teams agreed to play both matches in the same venue. Teams listed first played the first leg at home. Bolded teams qualified for the semifinals.

|}

Notes
a Both legs were hosted by Gran Canaria.
b Both legs were hosted by Kastamonu Bld. GSK.

Semifinals

|}

Final
Team listed first played the first leg at home.

|}

See also
2015–16 Women's EHF Champions League
2015–16 Women's EHF Cup Winners' Cup
2015–16 Women's EHF Cup

Women's EHF Challenge Cup
EHF Challenge Cup
EHF Challenge Cup